Robert Martin Gumbura (1955/1956 – 7 August 2021) was the pastor of the RMG Independent End Time Message Church in Zimbabwe.

Biography
Gumbura was a practitioner of polygamy, and a follower of the teachings of American charismatic preacher William Branham, sometimes called Branhamism or The Message.

Gumbura's estate was described as a compound, that included a large central home, multiple surrounding cottages, and a church building. The area was surrounded by walls and locked gates. His home was lavishly furnished and included artwork featuring himself, Jesus Christ, and William Branham. News media reported there were about 400 members of his church. Gumbara lived at the compound with his eleven wives and thirty children, and other members of his church congregation. Gumbura was arrested and charged with nine counts of rape and possession of illegal pornographic material in 2013. He was cleared on four counts of rape, and was convicted of four counts of rape and one on possession of pornographic material on 31 January 2014. Testimony at the trial alleged that he had claimed he had the right to have sexual intercourse with any woman in his congregation, and news reports stated he had relations with over 100 women in the church, and that he treated the women of the church as "his personal property" and would "loan out" the women to other men in the church.  He was initially sentenced to 50 years in Chikurubi Prison, but ten years were suspended from his sentence for good behavior, resulting in an expected sentence of 40 years. His church was also suspended by Zimbabwe's religious body, the Apostolic Christian Council of Zimbabwe (ACCZ).

On 18 March 2015, vice president and justice minister Emmerson Mnangagwa told the Parliament of Zimbabwe that Gumbura was one of more than 100 inmates involved in the planning of a violent riot over food that broke out at the prison on 13 March.

Gumbura died on 7 August 2021, from complications of COVID-19 at the Chikurubi Prison in Harare.

References

1950s births
Year of birth uncertain
2021 deaths
Zimbabwean criminals
Members of the clergy convicted of rape
Deaths from the COVID-19 pandemic in Zimbabwe
Prisoners who died from COVID-19